Huzzah Creek may refer to:

Huzzah Creek (Meramec River), a stream in Missouri
Huzzah Creek (St. Francis River), a stream in Missouri